The Two Rivals (Spanish: Los Dos rivales) is a 1944 Argentine film.

Cast

External links
 

1944 films
1940s Spanish-language films
Argentine black-and-white films
Argentine musical films
1944 musical films
1940s Argentine films